is a Japanese footballer currently playing as a midfielder for Fagiano Okayama.

Career statistics

Club
.

Notes

References

1999 births
Living people
Association football people from Kanagawa Prefecture
Waseda University alumni
Japanese footballers
Japan youth international footballers
Association football midfielders
J2 League players
Fagiano Okayama players